Felice Giuseppe Benasedo (6 May 1922 - 10 January 2016) was a former Italian Grand Prix motorcycle road racer from Italy. He had his best season in 1950 when he finished in seventh place in the 125cc world championship.

Career statistics

By season

References

External links
 Profile on motogp.com

1922 births
Sportspeople from Monza
Italian motorcycle racers
500cc World Championship riders
125cc World Championship riders
2016 deaths